Gaby Huber, (born 7 August 1980, in Zurich) is a professional squash player who represents Switzerland. She reached a career-high world ranking of World No. 29 in January, 2012. She has won the Swiss national championship six times, 2007, 2009, 2010, 2011, 2012, 2013 and 2014.

References

External links 

Swiss female squash players
Living people
1980 births
Sportspeople from Zürich